Peyssies is a commune in the Haute-Garonne department in southwestern France.

Geography

The Louge forms most of the commune's western border. The border between Bois-de-la-Pierre and Peyssies is formed by the river Louge.

The commune is bordered by five other communes: Bois-de-la-Pierre across the river Louge to the northwest, Longages to the north, Carbonne to the east, Lafitte-Vigordane to the south, and finally by Gratens to the west.

Population

See also
Communes of the Haute-Garonne department

References

Communes of Haute-Garonne